The 2017–18 Duquesne Dukes men's basketball team represented Duquesne University during the 2017–18 NCAA Division I men's basketball season. The Dukes, led by first-year head coach Keith Dambrot, played their home games at the A. J. Palumbo Center in Pittsburgh, Pennsylvania as members of the Atlantic 10 Conference. They finished the season 16–16, 7–11 in A-10 play to finish in a three-way tie for 10th place. As the No. 10 seed in the A-10 tournament, they lost Richmond in the second round.

Previous season
The Dukes finished the 2016–17 season 10–22, 3–15 in A-10 play to finish in last place. In the A-10 tournament, they lost in the first round to Saint Louis.

On March 13, 2017, Duquesne fired head coach Jim Ferry after five seasons. The school then hired Akron head coach Keith Dambrot on March 28.

Offseason

Departures

Incoming transfers

2017 recruiting class

2018 Recruiting class

Preseason
In a poll of the league’s head coaches and select media members at the conference's media day, the Dukes were picked to finish in last place in the A-10. Mike Lewis II was named to the conference's preseason third team.

Roster

Schedule and results

|-
!colspan=9 style=| Non-conference regular season

|-
!colspan=9 style=|Atlantic 10 regular season

|-
!colspan=9 style=|Atlantic 10 tournament

Source

See also
 2017–18 Duquesne Dukes women's basketball team

References

Duquesne
Duquesne Dukes men's basketball seasons
Duquesne
Duquesne